Robert "Bob" Brettle (1832–1872) was a successful bare-knuckle boxer active in Birmingham, England, during the 1850s. He was known as "The Birmingham Pet".

A silver belt, given to him by his patrons to honour his achievements, and made in Birmingham, was featured on the television programme Antiques Roadshow, while in the possession of one of his descendants. It was subsequently donated to the British Boxing Board of Control and is now displayed at their headquarters.

Brettle died aged 40 and is buried in the churchyard of St. Peter's Church, Harborne in Birmingham.

Fights

References

External links

1832 births
1872 deaths
Bare-knuckle boxers
People from Portobello, Edinburgh
Boxers from Edinburgh
English male boxers
Scottish male boxers